Intensify is the second studio album by English electronic music duo Way Out West, released on 20 August 2001 by Distinct'ive Records. The album was marked by a move from the defunct Deconstruction Records label to Distinctive, and a change in their sound, from club instrumentals and sampled vocals to a mixture of club tracks and original songs.

Release
On 27 November 2000, Way Out West released the album's first single, "The Fall", through BMG; the former parent company of the group's previous label Deconstruction Records (defunct in 1998). "The Fall" peaked at #61 on the UK Singles Chart and was followed by the group's final release on BMG, the UB Devoid EP. In 2001, the group were signed to Distinct'ive Records, and released the album's second single and title track, "Intensify", shortly before the album's release date, on 6 August 2001. Distinct'ive then released Intensify worldwide on 20 August 2001 to success, with the album peaking at #61 on the UK Albums Chart.

In 2002, after the album's release, its third single "Mindcircus" (featuring Tricia Lee Kelshall) was released and, supported by a remix from Gabriel & Dresden, reached number 1 in the UK Dance Chart that year. The album's final single, "Stealth" (featuring Kirsty Hawkshaw), was released on 19 August 2002 and reached #67 on the UK Singles Chart that year.

The track "Activity" appears on the soundtrack to the 2001 PlayStation 2 videogame, Kinetica.

Critical reception
Upon release, Intensify was met with generally positive reviews from critics. Dean Carlson from Allmusic summarised the album as "a glittering, expressive trance record". Christian Hopwood from BBC Music commented that "it might lack the variety of the first album (Way Out West)", although he also praised the album, claiming it has a "wide screen, cinematic feel".

Track listing

Personnel
 Jody Wisternoff - production, keyboards, synths, samples, programming
 Nick Warren -  production, engineering, mixing
 Adam Pickard  - drums ("Mindcircus", "Intensify (Part 01)", "Intensify (Part 02)") additional programming ("Call Me", "Stealth")
 Ally Kennen - vocals ("Intensify (Part 01)", "Intensify (Part 02)")
 Imogen Heap - writing ("Mindcircus")
 Tricia Lee Kelshall - vocals ("Mindcircus")
 Kirsty Hawkshaw - vocals ("Stealth")

Charts

Release history

References

Way Out West (duo) albums
2001 albums
Distinct'ive Records albums